The Liga I (First League), also spelled as Liga 1, is a Romanian professional league for men's association football clubs. Currently sponsored by betting company Superbet, it is officially known as the SuperLiga. It is the country's top football competition, being contested by 16 clubs which take part in a promotion and relegation system with the Liga II. The teams play 30 matches each in the regular season, before entering the championship play-offs or the relegation play-outs according to their position in the regular table.

The Liga I was established in 1909 and commenced play for the 1909–10 campaign, being currently on the 29th place in UEFA's league coefficient ranking list. It is administered by the Liga Profesionistă de Fotbal, also known by the acronym LPF. Before the 2006–07 season, the competition was known as Divizia A, but the name had to be changed following the finding that someone else had registered that trademark.

The best performer to date is FCSB with 26 titles, followed by longtime cross-town rival Dinamo București with 18 trophies. Furthermore, of the remaining 21 clubs which came victorious in the competition, eight have won it on at least three occasions—CFR Cluj (eight trophies), Venus București (seven), Chinezul Timișoara and UTA Arad (six each), Ripensia Timișoara, Universitatea Craiova and Petrolul Ploiești (four each), and Rapid București (three).

History

Early championships (1909–1921)

The first official national football tournament was organized in 1909 by the recently founded Romanian Football Federation, then called the Association of Athletic Societies in Romania. The final matches of the first Romanian Football Championship were held between December 1909 and January 1910 in Bucharest. The three pioneer clubs were Olympia and Colentina from Bucharest and United from Ploiești. Each team played a fixture against the other two clubs, totalizing a number of three matches disputed, with Olympia București being crowned as champions of the first Romanian Football Championship. In the following years, the tournament was structured into regional groups with the winners of each group participating in a playoff with the eventual winners being declared champions. From 1909 until 1921, the championship was organized as a cup with the winner being crowned as Champions of Romania, except for between 1916 and 1919, when the competition was suspended due to World War I. The champions of this period were Olympia and Colentina, each with two titles, and United, Prahova, Venus, Unirea Tricolor București and Româno-Americana, with one title each.

Divizia A (1921–2006)

The 1921–22 season marked the first time when a league consisting of seven teams was formed. The championship, which had been confined to several regional leagues, became a national competition in 1921 with the foundation of Divizia A and Divizia B. The inaugural Divizia A season was won by Chinezul Timișoara. Before the 1931–32 season, the competition was dominated by Chinezul and Venus București, with Chinezul winning six championships and Venus two championships during the eleven seasons. The 1932–33 season saw the rise of another successful team, Ripensia Timișoara, which alongside rivals Venus, won eight of the following nine championships, before the competition was suspended in 1940 due to World War II.

The post-war years were dominated by UTA Arad, CCA București and Petrolul Ploiești. The 1960s saw the gradual emergence of Dinamo București, with the help from strikers Gheorghe Ene and Florea Dumitrache—both of whom became some of Divizia A's top all-time scorers. The 1970s saw the rise of Dudu Georgescu, from Dinamo București, who was Divizia A's leading scorer for four seasons between 1974 and 1978. He scored an impressive 156 goals and won the European Golden Shoe award for the top scorer in Europe twice, in 1975 and 1977. Dinamo București also had two more European Golden Shoe winners in the 1986–87 season in the name of Rodion Cămătaru and in the 1988–89 season in the name of Dorin Mateuţ, with the latter being the last Romanian winner of the trophy. From the 1959–60 season all the way to the 1999–2000 season all the league championships were won by only seven teams: Steaua (16 titles), Dinamo (14 titles), Universitatea Craiova (4 titles), Rapid București, FC Argeș and UTA Arad (2 titles each), and Petrolul Ploiești (one title).

Dinamo București was the first Romanian team to qualify into the European Champions Cup in the 1956–57 season of the competition and Universitatea Craiova was the last team from Romania to qualify in the 1991–92 season, before the competition changed its name to the UEFA Champions League. Romanian teams qualified to 35 of the 37 seasons of the European Champions Cup, with Dinamo București having thirteen appearances, Steaua București having ten appearances, Universitatea Craiova having four appearances, Petrolul having three appearances, UTA Arad and FC Argeş having two appearances and Rapid București having one appearance. The most important results for a Romanian team in this competition were achieved by Steaua București which won the trophy in the 1985–86 season, and reached the semi-finals in the 1987–88 season and another final in the 1988–89 season. Other important achievements include Universitatea Craiova which reached the quarter-finals in the 1981–82 season and Dinamo București which reached the semi-finals in the 1983–84 season. However, after the change of the format in 1992–93 to the current Champions League format, Romanian champions have achieved limited successes, with Steaua only reaching the group stage three times before the 21st century.

The beginning of the 2000s were dominated by teams from the capital, with Steaua, Dinamo and Rapid winning all the league titles between 2000 and 2007.

Liga I (2006–present) 

At the beginning of the 2006–07 season the competition was forced to change its name from Divizia A to Liga I due to a trademark dispute over the name. The change was made on 15 May 2006, and the Romanian Football Federation decided to also rename the lower leagues; thus Divizia B became Liga II, Divizia C became Liga III, and so on. The 2006–07 season marked the 16th straight time a team from Bucharest won the championship, with Dinamo winning the title. Both 2007–08 and 2008–09 saw new title winners as CFR Cluj and Unirea Urziceni were crowned champions for the first time. CFR Cluj won their second championship in 2009–10, while the 2010–11 saw another new winner, Oțelul Galați. Oțelul is the first and only club from the region of Moldavia to win a national title so far.

CFR Cluj, the 2007–08 winner became the first Romanian team to qualify directly into the 2008–09 group stage of the UEFA Champions League, and the first team other than Steaua to qualify to this stage since the beginning of the new Champions League format in 1992–93. The 2009–10 champions as well as 2010–11 ones were guaranteed a direct qualification spot into the group stage as well. The best results in the group stage was obtained by CFR Cluj in the 2012–13 UEFA Champions League with ten points and third place in a group with Manchester United, Braga, and Galatasaray.

The 2010s also brought new league winners in Liga I, with Astra Giurgiu and Viitorul Constanța clinching the titles in 2015–16 and 2016–17 respectively. Since 2017 onwards, CFR Cluj won five consecutive Liga I titles, amassing a total number of eight national titles as of 2022. CFR Cluj obtained the best result of a Romanian team in the group stage in the 2019-2020 season of Europa League - 12 points. Also, CFR Cluj became the first Romanian team to qualify to UEFA Conference League group stage, when they obtained 4 points in the inaugural season(2021-2022).

Competition format
Starting with 2020, the Liga I has been expanded to a 16-team format. After each team plays the others twice for 30 fixtures, they are ranked by total points and then divided according to their position to enter either the championship play-offs or the relegation play-outs. At this stage, the points are halved in two and criteria such as goal difference, goals scored etc. are erased completely.

The six clubs which enter the championship play-offs play ten games, while the remaining ten in the relegation play-outs will only play each other once, resulting in nine fixtures. The championship play-offs winners are also crowned winners of the season's Liga I. The 9th and 10th positions in the play-out are relegated directly to the Liga II, while the 7th- and 8th-placed teams will play a two-legged tie against the 3rd and 4th teams from the second league's table.

Also, the 1st and 2nd teams from the play-out phase will play a one-legged game between each other and the winner will face the last team that completed the play-off phase in a European spot. The winner of that one-legged match will play next season in the UEFA Europa Conference League.

Clubs

Wins by club 

Bold indicates clubs currently playing in 2022–23 Liga I. Teams in italics no longer exist. Teams in neither bold or italics are existing past winners of the championship that play in Romania's lower leagues.

2022–23 season 

The following 16 clubs are competing in the Liga I during the 2022–23 season.

Sponsorship
On 19 December 1998, SABMiller bought the naming rights for four and a half seasons, becoming the first sponsor in the history of the competition. SABMiller changed the name of the competition to "Divizia A Ursus", to promote their Ursus beer.

Starting with the 2004–05 season, European Drinks & Foods, a Romanian $1.3 billion USD revenue company, took over as main sponsor and changed the league's name to "Divizia A Bürger", to promote their Bürger beer.

On 11 May 2008, Realitatea Media bought the naming rights and changed the name of the competition to "Liga I Realitatea", to promote their Realitatea TV station.

In late 2008, European Drinks & Foods again bought the rights and the league was renamed as the "Liga I Frutti Fresh", after one of their soft drinks brand.

For the 2009–10 season, the online betting firm Gamebookers purchased the league naming rights and renamed the division "Liga 1 Gamebookers.com".

In July 2010, Bergenbier, a StarBev Group company, bought the naming rights for four seasons and changed the name of the competition to "Liga I Bergenbier", to promote their Bergenbier beer.

From the 2015–16 season, the French telecommunications corporation Orange became the main sponsor of the Romanian first league, after purchasing the league naming rights, for two years, and renamed the league in Liga 1 Orange.

From the 2017–18 season, the international online gaming operator Betano became the main sponsor of the Romanian first league, after purchasing the league naming rights, for two years, and renamed the league in 'Liga 1 Betano'.

For the 2019–20 season, the national online gaming operator Casa Pariurilor became the main sponsor of the Romanian first league, after purchasing the league naming rights, and renamed the league in 'Casa Liga 1'.

For the 2022-23 season the operator of games in Romania Superbet is the sponsor of the leagues and the name changes to Superliga Romnaniei

Media coverage
In 2004, Telesport, a small TV network, bought the broadcasting rights for $28 million. The four seasons contract ended in the summer of 2008. Telesport sold some of the broadcasting rights for matches to other Romanian networks, including, TVR1, Antena 1, Național TV, and Kanal D.

On 31 March 2008, Antena 1 with RCS & RDS outbid Realitatea Media and Kanal D in the broadcasting rights auction with a bid of €102 million for a three seasons contract.

In 2011, the broadcasting rights were bought by RCS & RDS for their channels Digi Sport 1, Digi Sport 2 and Digi Sport 3. This channels aired broadcasting of seven of the nine matches from each stage of the championship. The other two matches were broadcast by Antena 1 (an Intact Media Group channel) and Dolce Sport (a channel owned by Telekom Romania).

In March 2014, LPF announced that the rights were sold for a five-year period to a company from the European Union, without specifying the company's name. A month later, Look TV and Look Plus were revealed as the TV stations that would broadcast the games from Liga I and Cupa Ligii between 2014 and 2019.

EA Sports
On 27 August 2019, Liga I signed a contract with EA Sports for the rights of the league for FIFA 20. It was the first time that the Liga I had been featured in a sports video game. Liga I has been featured in every FIFA installment since then.

Records

Players

Managers

Referees

International competitions

Performance in international competitions
From the quarter-finals onwards.

UEFA ranking

UEFA League Ranking as of 11 September:
 22. (22)  Allsvenskan
 23. (23)  First Professional Football League
 24. (24)  Liga I
 25. (25)  Eliteserien
 26. (26)  Azerbaijan Premier League

See also

 Football records and statistics in Romania
 List of foreign Liga I players
 List of Romanian expatriate footballers
 List of attendance figures at domestic professional sports leagues
 Liga II
 Liga III
 Liga IV
 Liga I Feminin

Notes

References

External links
 Liga Profesionistă de Fotbal official website
 Results and statistics from 1932 onwards at labtof.ro

 
1
Romania
1909 establishments in Romania
Sports leagues established in 1909
Football
Professional sports leagues in Romania